Kenneth Giske (born 6 January 1976) is a retired Norwegian football midfielder.

He started his career in Valder IL and represented Norway as a youth international. He joined IL Hødd ahead of the 1993 season. After good performances, he was signed by Lillestrøm SK. Never breaking through there, he returned to Hødd until he was picked up by Bryne FK in 1999. Struggling with injuries, in 2001 he signed for lowly Randaberg IL, but was again given the chance at Bryne in the summer of 2001.

In 2006 he was player-manager of Klepp IL, but the team was relegated from the 2006 2. divisjon. He later featured on the pitch for Valder, Klepp and Kåsen before finally retiring in the end of 2012.

In 2019 he became coach of Bryne's junior team.

References

1976 births
Living people
People from Giske
Norwegian footballers
IL Hødd players
Lillestrøm SK players
Bryne FK players
Randaberg IL players
Klepp IL (men) players
Eliteserien players
Norwegian First Division players
Association football midfielders
Norway youth international footballers
Norway under-21 international footballers
Sportspeople from Møre og Romsdal